Namssiguia is a town in the Bourzanga Department of Bam Province in northern Burkina Faso. It has a population of 2,776.

Massacre 
In January 2022, Islamist militants killed looted the town, killing ten people.

References

External links
Satellite map at Maplandia.com

Populated places in the Centre-Nord Region
Bam Province